Holcut was a small town located in Tishomingo County, Mississippi, United States. In 1976,  the U.S. Army Corps of Engineers bought out and demolished the town because it lay in the path of the Divide Cut, a  canal section of the Tennessee–Tombigbee Waterway, which was constructed between 1972 and 1984.

After the town was demolished, the Corps of Engineers established a Holcut memorial next to the canal near the site of the town.

References

External links
Corps of Engineers: Pictures of Holcut Memorial

1976 disestablishments in Mississippi
Former populated places in Tishomingo County, Mississippi
Former populated places in Mississippi
Submerged settlements in the United States
Populated places disestablished in 1976